Tsarmitunturi Wilderness Area is a wilderness reserve in Inari municipality, Lapland, Finland. It was established in 1991 like all the other wilderness areas in Lapland.

References

External links 

Protected areas established in 1991
1991 establishments in Finland
Wilderness areas of Finland